Abyssothauma psilarosis is a species of sea snail, a marine gastropod mollusk in the family Raphitomidae.

Description
Operculum narrow and amber-colored. Body pale, with eyes at the base of short tentacles. Radula with 15 pairs of elongate teeth.

Distribution
This is a deep-sea species, occurring off South Africa

References

External links
 
 Biolib.cz: Abyssothauma psilarosis

Endemic fauna of South Africa
psilarosis
Gastropods described in 1986